Colin Parry is the name of:
Colin Parry (footballer) (born 1941), English footballer
Colin Parry (actor) (born 1977), British actor
Colin Parry, founder of the Tim Parry Johnathan Ball Foundation for Peace